Sebastian Lauritzen  is a former Swedish professional ice hockey winger.

He has played for Djurgårdens IF, Brynäs IF and Linköping HC of the SHL, Timrå IK, Bofors IK, IF Sundsvall and Växjö Lakers of the Allsvenskan and KalPa of the Finnish Elite League (Liiga).

Lauritzen made his Elitserien debut playing with Timrå IK during the 2001–02 Elitserien playoffs.

He retired on the 8th of May 2018 following the results of a concussion in August 2017.

References

External links

1983 births
Brynäs IF players
Djurgårdens IF Hockey players
KalPa players
Linköping HC players
Living people
Timrå IK players
Swedish ice hockey left wingers
People from Sundsvall
Sportspeople from Västernorrland County